Indiophonus pilosus is a species of beetle in the family Carabidae, the only species in the genus Indiophonus.

References

Harpalinae
Monotypic Carabidae genera